Om is a sacred syllable in Jainism, Hinduism, Buddhism, and Sikhism.

OM, om, and variations, may also refer to:

Arts and entertainment

Fiction
 Om (1995 film), an Indian Kannada film
 Om (2003 film), a Bollywood film
 Om (2018 film), a Kollywood film
 Omkara (2004 film), a 2004 Indian Kannada film
 Omkara (2006 film), a 2006 Indian Bollywood film
 Om, the lead character in the 2007 Bollywood film Om Shanti Om
 Om, any one of the humans in the 1973 animated film Fantastic Planet

Music
 Om (band), a doom metal band
 Om (Ibarra album), a 1996 album
 Om (John Coltrane album), a 1965 album
 OM (Negură Bunget album), a 2006 album
 Om (Soulfly album), a 2002 album also known as 3
 "Om" (The Moody Blues song), a 1968 song
 OM Festival, a Canadian electronic music festival
 Om Records, a San Francisco-based dance music record label, home to artist like J Boogie, Kaskade, and King Kooba
 Of Machines, a post-hardcore band
 Orchestra Model, an acoustic guitar by Martin Guitars

People
 Om Bhatia, Indo-Canadian actor better known as Akshay Kumar
 Om Puri, Indian actor
 Om family, eastern Bengali family

Businesses and organizations
 MIAT-Mongolian Airlines (IATA code OM)
 Odyssey of the Mind, an international problem-solving competition for students
 Officine Meccaniche, a former Italian motor vehicle manufacturer
 Olympique de Marseille, a French football club
 Operation Mobilisation, a Christian non-profit missions organization
 Orlando Magic, a basketball team in the NBA
 OM AB, a Swedish exchange which merged with Finnish HEX plc to become OMX

Honors and orders
 Order of Manitoba, the post-nominal letters indicating membership in an honour of the Crown in Right of Manitoba
 Order of Merit, post-nominal letters indicating membership in a high honour from the monarch of the Commonwealth realms
 Order of Merit (Jamaica), post-nominal letters indicating membership of the Order of Merit in the Jamaican honours system
 Order of the Minims, the post-nominal letters indicating membership in a Roman Catholic religious order founded by Francis of Paola in the fifteenth century in Italy

Language
 Oromo language (ISO 639-1: "om")
 Oto-Manguean languages (abbreviated as "OM")

Places
 Øm Abbey, a Cistercian abbey which was in Søhøjlandet, in Denmark
 Om (river), a tributary of the Irtysh in Siberia, Russia
 Oman (ISO 3166 country code OM)
 .om, the country code top level domain (ccTLD) for Oman
 Omu Peak, in the Bucegi Mountains of Romania

Science and technology

Biology and medicine
 Occupational medicine, a medical specialty
 Osteomyelitis, a bone marrow infection
 Otitis media, an infection of the middle ear
 Bacterial outer membrane, a layer found in gram-negative bacteria

Computing and telecommunications
 .om, the country code top level domain (ccTLD) for Oman
 Openmoko Linux, a mobile operating system developed by the Openmoko project

Other uses in science and technology
 Builder's Old Measurement (abbr. OM or om) - a method of calculating tonnage (i.e. cargo capacity) for merchant ships in the age of sail
 Olympus OM system, a family of Olympus SLR cameras made between 1972 and 2002
 Organic matter
 Osipkov–Merritt models, mathematical representations of spherical stellar systems

Other uses

 Minim (religious order) (O.M.), is a member of the Roman Catholic religious order of friars
 Offering memorandum, in finance, "the OM", prospectus for a bond offering
 Old Man, meaning a male amateur radio operator
 List of Old Marlburians, alumni of Marlborough College
 Old Millfieldians, alumni of Millfield School
 Olympique de Marseille, a French football club in Marseille
 Om (actor), Bengali actor
 Operating margin, in business
 Operation Mindfuck, a practice within Discordianism
 Orgasmic meditation, a meditational practice in which the object of meditation is finger to genital (usually clitoris) contact
 Could be used as a short name for Om Nom from the "Cut the Rope" games.

See also
 Aum (disambiguation)
 O&M (disambiguation)
 OAM (disambiguation)
 Ohm (disambiguation)
 OMS (disambiguation)
 Omu (disambiguation)
 Aum Shinrikyo, a Japanese new religious movement, known for carrying out the Sarin gas attacks in the Tokyo subways